Greysouthen is a village and civil parish between the towns of Workington and Cockermouth, in Cumbria, North West England, historically part of Cumberland, near the Lake District National Park. The village has an historic association with coal mining.

History
John Marius Wilson's 1870 Imperial Gazetteer described Greysouthen as a settlement of 136 houses, an agricultural implement factory, a Quakers' chapel, a Wesleyan chapel and a flex mill. In 1901 Greysouthen civil parish had an area of 1,558 acres [CONVERT?]

Governance
Greysouthen, is part of the Workington constituency of the UK parliament. The current Member of Parliament is Sue Hayman, a member of the Labour Party. The Labour Party has won the seat in every general election since 1979; the Conservative Party has only been elected once in Workington since the Second World War: in the 1976 Workington by-election.

Before Brexit for the European Parliament residents in Greysouthen voted to elect MEP's for the North West England constituency.

For Local Government purposes it is in the Dalton Ward of Allerdale Borough Council and the Cockermouth South Division of Cumbria County Council.

Greysouthen has its own Parish Council; Greysouthen Parish Council.

Mining
Evidence of settlers digging for coal across west Cumbria can be dated back to the 13th century. Evidence of mining for coal within the Greysouthen area can be seen from the late 16th century.

The largest portion of Greysouthen's Coal lease was sold to William Walker & Company in 1787. The business continued to remain profitable for the next 80 years. In 1800 another firm took claim to a portion of the Greysouthen coal extraction industry. Wilson & Company invested in another Colliery within Greysouthen. The two colliery's distributed coal tokens which represented the success of the mines. Between these two mines a feud broke out over mine space. Wilson & Co was fined £16,000 damages over illegally mining William Walker & Company's land.

By the start of the 19th century Greysouthen's thriving mining industry had become the sole employer. To house miners, small rows of cottages were built within the town. In 1823 Joseph Birbeck and J.W. Flecter began mining in Greysouthen. A tax value of £20 was introduced for the annual lease of 400 tons of coal. For every ton mined over this, an additional tax of 1 shilling was applied.

The Melgramfitz pit was closed in 1886, which led to the end of the Greysouthen as a coal mining community.

Greysouthen's 19th century miners were known for their ale consumption, which magistrates felt was their prime concern.

Community
Greysouthen is surrounded by farmland through which two streams run. The village is divided into two by the local residents – "up the went" and "down the went". The 'went' is a hill at the centre of Greysouthen.

Greysouthen has one large playing field with an adventure playground, football pitch, and a garden commemorating the Queen's Silver Jubilee.

Greysouthen had previously received a bus service, which stopped about ten times daily with connections to Workington and Cockermouth. The service was subsidised by the county council and operated by minor bus companies. It ended in 2015.

The village is in the catchment area for Paddle Primary Academy, a Church of England institution, in the neighbouring village of Eaglesfield, and is also in catchment for Cockermouth School and Keswick School, Cockermouth being nearer.

The parish council has been supporting Cumbrian rural communities over the introduction of superfast broadband and mobile coverage. Superfast broadband was activated in the village in January 2015.

Ecology

The Greysouthen area supports a variety of bird species including northern lapwings, common snipes, Eurasian curlews, common woodpigeons, buzzards, Eurasian oystercatchers, common pheasants, Eurasian sparrowhawks, and quail. Red squirrels are also found. Orange tips, red admirals, and painted lady butterflies occur within the area.

Locally growing west Cumbrian wild plants include the greater butterfly orchid, early purple orchid and yellow rattle.

Population

The population of Greysouthen between 1880 and 1900 fell by about 210 people in a 20-year period, this a period after the closure of the local mines.

See also

Listed buildings in Greysouthen

References

External links
  Cumbria County History Trust: Greysouthen (nb: provisional research only - see Talk page)

Villages in Cumbria
Allerdale
Civil parishes in Cumbria